Palashkino is a rural locality (a selo) in Vtorovskoye Rural Settlement, Kameshkovsky District, Vladimir Oblast, Russia. The population was 38 as of 2010. There is 1 street.

Geography 
Palashkino is located 28 km southwest of Kameshkovo (the district's administrative centre) by road. Chistukha is the nearest rural locality.

References 

Rural localities in Kameshkovsky District
Vladimirsky Uyezd